Parientes a la fuerza (English: Family by Force) is an American telenovela that aired on Telemundo from 26 October 2021 to 21 March 2022. The series is produced by 11:11 Films & TV for Telemundo. It stars Bárbara de Regil, Guy Ecker, Michel Duval, and Chantal Andere.

Plot 
George Cruz is a 50 year old Hollywood screenwriter who is suffering a midlife crisis under the shadow of his only success, the death of his mother, and his wife, Leticia, cheating on him. His frustration, loneliness, and feeling like a failure take him to Mexico where he meets Carmen Jurado, a Mexican singer that turns into his muse, artist, and great love. George regains his inspiration and happiness that make him feel alive.

Cast

Main 
 Bárbara de Regil as Carmen Jurado
 Guy Ecker as George Cruz
 Michel Duval as Andy Cruz
 Chantal Andere as Leticia Sanz
 Carmen Aub as Clío Bonnet
 Lisa Owen as Margarita Hernández de Jurado
 Antonio de la Vega as Robert Ferguson
 Salvador Zerboni as Juancho Hernández
 Macaria as Mamá Rosa
 Alejandro Ávila as Tenoch Cruz
 Sofía Garza as Yuliana Hernández
 Mauricio Garza as Tomás
 Roberta Damián as Paz Cruz
 Patricia Martínez as María Cruz
 Daniel Raymont as Kurt
 Ana Pau Castell as Lara Jurado
 Elsy Reyes as Tania
 Gustavo Egelhaaf as Emiliano
 Enoc Leaño as Aristides
 Luca Valentini as  Rocco Cruz
 Toño Valdés as Pedro Cruz
 Verónica Montes as Sharpay
 Angely Gaviria as Gina
 Victor Jiménez as Don
 Fermín Martínez as Aurelio Ruiz
 Rodolfo Valdés as Rick Jones
 Juan Vidal as Wesley
 Nancy Taira as Sofía
 Tomás Rojas as Camilo Bustillo

Recurring 
 Nashla Aguilar as Lulú
 Leonardo Álvarez as Alan Davila
 Iker García as Cameron
 Diana Quijano as Michelle Bonnet
 Ernesto Álvarez as Macario
 Hamlet Ramírez
 Miguel Islas as Pepe

Reception

Ratings 
The series premiered with a total of 999,000 viewers. The series was pulled from Telemundo's prime time schedule after thirteen episodes due to low ratings. On 15 November 2021 the series moved to the late night timeslot of 12am/11c.

Awards and nominations

Episodes

References

External links 

2021 telenovelas
2021 American television series debuts
2022 American television series endings
Spanish-language American telenovelas
Telemundo telenovelas
Television shows set in Mexico